Llagostera is a municipality in the comarca of the Gironès in Catalonia, Spain. During the 20th century, it was known for the production of cork and derived articles. It is located 20 km south of Girona and 15 km west from the Mediterranean Sea.

Between 1892 and 1969, Llagostera was connected to the city of Girona and the port of Sant Feliu de Guíxols by the narrow gauge Sant Feliu de Guíxols–Girona railway. The line has since been converted into a greenway.

Demography

Sports
Llagostera is the smallest town ever to have a team in the top two divisions of Spanish football, UE Llagostera. They won the 2020 Copa Federación de España.

References

Bibliography
 Panareda Clopés, Josep Maria; Rios Calvet, Jaume; Rabella Vives, Josep Maria (1989). Guia de Catalunya, Barcelona: Caixa de Catalunya.  (Spanish).  (Catalan).

External links

Official website
 Government data pages 

Municipalities in Gironès
Populated places in Gironès